Shiplate Slait is a 33.9 hectare biological Site of Special Scientific Interest near the village of Loxton, within the Mendip Hills Area of Outstanding Natural Beauty, North Somerset, notified in 1987.

The site is underlain by Clifton Down Limestone, Burrington Oolite, Black Rock Dolomite and Black Rock Limestone of the Carboniferous Limestone Series. There is dolomitic conglomerate (Triassic Mudstone) at the lower edges of the site. The site has unimproved calcicolous grassland, some of which is mixed with dwarf-shrub, mosaics of calcicolous grassland and scrub and woodland. Four nationally rare types of vegetation form most of the grassland. Rare species include Koeleria vallesiana (Somerset hair-grass), Carex humilis (dwarf sedge) and Potentilla tabernaemontani (spring cinquefoil).

Two further bowl barrows are also scheduled.

References

Sites of Special Scientific Interest in North Somerset
Sites of Special Scientific Interest notified in 1987
Mendip Hills
Scheduled monuments in North Somerset